Southby is a surname. Notable people with the surname include:

Geoff Southby (born 1950), Australian rules footballer
John Southby (disambiguation), several people
Rhianna Southby (born 2000), English cricketer
Richard Southby (1623–1704), English politician
Southby Baronets